W. H. Paige and Company is a music instrument retailer based in Indianapolis, Indiana. The company was founded in 1871 in Terre Haute, Indiana, by William H. Paige, a vocal music teacher, and W. B. Warton, a real estate agent. The company sold a variety of musical instruments, books, and phonographs. William Paige died in 1901, and the company was then operated by his sons Warner and Frederick.

By 1977, the company was run by Warner Paige III, who opened a second location in Indianapolis. The Terre Haute location was later closed, as was a satellite store in Kokomo, Indiana. The company now focuses primarily on band and orchestra instruments for schools. The company is listed in the "Top 200 Music Stores Ranked by Sales" by The Music Trades.

References

External links
Paige's Music
Warner Paige NAMM Oral History Interview (2004)
Mark Goff NAMM Oral History Interview (2011)
Sandy Goff Interview NAMM Oral History Library (2022)

Companies based in Indianapolis
Retail companies established in 1871
Musical instrument retailers of the United States